Qabasin is a town located northeast of the city of Al-Bab in northern Syria. It is administratively part of the Al-Bab nahiya in the Al-Bab District of the Aleppo Governorate. 11,382 people lived in the town in 2004. A nearby town is Arima, to the north-east.

Syrian civil war
During the Syrian civil war, the town was initially captured by the Syrian opposition and later by ISIL. ISIL kidnapped hundreds of Kurdish civilians from the town and executed dozens of them between 2014 and 2016.

On 23 February 2017, the Syrian National Army and the Turkish army captured the town from ISIL as well as the nearby towns of B'zaa and al-Bab after months of fighting.

References

Populated places in al-Bab District